Robert Reid Jack (17 January 1924 – 25 June 2003) was a Scottish amateur golfer. He tied for 5th place in the 1959 Open Championship and played in the Walker Cup in 1957 and 1959.

Amateur wins
1955 Scottish Amateur
1957 Amateur Championship

Results in major championships

Note: Jack only played in The Open Championship.

"T" indicates a tie for a place

Team appearances
Walker Cup (representing Great Britain & Ireland): 1957, 1959
Eisenhower Trophy (representing Great Britain & Ireland): 1958 (individual leader, tie)
Amateurs–Professionals Match (representing the Amateurs): 1956, 1957, 1958 (winners), 1959
St Andrews Trophy (representing Great Britain & Ireland): 1956 (winners)
Commonwealth Tournament (representing Great Britain): 1959

References

Scottish male golfers
Amateur golfers
People from Cumbernauld
1924 births
2003 deaths